Spessard Holland (1892–1971) was a U.S. Senator from Florida from 1946 to 1971. Senator Holland may also refer to:

Bruce Holland (American politician) (born 1968), Arkansas State Senate
Clarence A. Holland (born 1929), Virginia State Senate
Edward Everett Holland (1861–1941), Virginia State Senate
Edward M. Holland (born 1939), Virginia State Senate
Elmer J. Holland (1894–1968), Pennsylvania State Senate
James Holland (North Carolina politician) (1754–1823), North Carolina State Senate
Joseph R. Holland (born 1936), New York State Senate
Richard J. Holland (1925–2000), Virginia Senate
Tom Holland (politician) (born 1961), Kansas State Senate